Non-fiction (or nonfiction) is any document or media content that attempts, in good faith, to convey information only about the real world, rather than being grounded in imagination. Non-fiction typically aims to present topics objectively based on historical, scientific, and empirical information. However, some non-fiction ranges into more subjective territory, including sincerely held opinions on real-world topics.

Based on the author's intention or the purpose of the content, the main genres of non-fiction are instructional, explanatory, discussion-based, report-based (non-chronological), opinion-based (persuasive) and relating (chronological recounting) non-fiction. Non-fictional works of these different genres can be created with the help of a range of structures or formats such as reference works (almanacs, encyclopedias, atlases, bibliographies, chronicles, consumer reports, dictionaries, thesauri, business or telephone directories, handbooks, yearbooks, books of quotations, etc), life writings (autobiographies, biographies, confessions, diaries, logs, memoirs, epistles, letters, postcards and letter collections, epitaphs, obituaries, etc.), literary criticism (book reports and book reviews), art criticism (movie reviews), promotional writing (brochures, pamphlets, press releases, advertorials, etc.), persuasive writing (apologias), essays and essay collections, history books, academic texts (scholarly papers including scientific papers, monographs, scientific journals, treatises, edited volumes, conference proceedings, etc.), news stories, editorials, letters to the editor, and opinion pieces, manifestos, notices (announcement), documentary films, textbooks, study guides, field guidess, travelogues, recipes, owner's manuals and user guides, self-help books, popular science books, blogs, presentations, etc. Non-fiction is a fundamental approach to narrative (storytelling), and often refers specifically to prose writingin contrast to narrative fiction, which is largely populated by imaginary characters and events (although some remain ambiguous regarding their basis in reality). Non-fiction writers can show the reasons and consequences of events, they can compare, contrast, classify, categorise and summarise information, put the facts in a logical or chronological order, infer and reach conclusions about facts, etc. They can use graphic, structural and printed appearance features such as pictures, graphs or charts, diagrams, flowcharts, summaries, glossaries, sidebars, timelines, table of contents, headings, subheadings, bolded or italicised words, footnotes, maps, indices, labels, captions, etc. to help readers find information.        

While specific claims in a non-fiction work may prove inaccurate, the sincere author aims to be truthful at the time of composition. A non-fiction account is an exercise in accurately representing a topic, and remains distinct from any implied endorsement.

Distinctions
The numerous narrative techniques used within fiction are generally thought inappropriate for use in non-fiction. They are still present particularly in older works, but are often muted so as not to overshadow the information within the work. Simplicity, clarity, and directness are some of the most important considerations when producing non-fiction. Audience is important in any artistic or descriptive endeavour, but it is perhaps most important in non-fiction. In fiction, the writer believes that readers will make an effort to follow and interpret an indirectly or abstractly presented progression of theme, whereas the production of non-fiction has more to do with the direct provision of information. Understanding of the potential readers' use for the work and their existing knowledge of a subject are both fundamental for effective non-fiction. Despite the claim to truth of non-fiction, it is often necessary to persuade the reader to agree with the ideas and so a balanced, coherent, and informed argument is vital. However, the boundaries between fiction and non-fiction are continually blurred and argued upon, especially in the field of biography; as Virginia Woolf said: "if we think of truth as something of granite-like solidity and of personality as something of rainbow-like intangibility and reflect that the aim of biography is to weld these two into one seamless whole, we shall admit that the problem is a stiff one and that we need not wonder if biographers, for the most part failed to solve it."

Including information that the author knows to be untrue within such works is usually regarded as dishonest. Still, certain kinds of written works can legitimately be either fiction or non-fiction, such as journals of self-expression, letters, magazine articles, and other expressions of imagination. Though they are mostly either one or the other, a blend of both is also possible. Some fiction may include non-fictional elements; semi-fiction is fiction implementing a great deal of non-fiction, (such as a fictional description based on a true story). Some non-fiction may include elements of unverified supposition, deduction, or imagination for the purpose of smoothing out a narrative, but the inclusion of open falsehoods would discredit it as a work of non-fiction. The publishing and the bookselling businesses sometimes use the phrase "literary non-fiction" to distinguish works with a more literary or intellectual bent, as opposed to the bulk of non-fiction subjects.

Types
Common literary examples of non-fiction include expository, argumentative, functional, and opinion pieces; essays on art or literature; biographies; memoirs; journalism; and historical, scientific, technical, or economic writings (including electronic ones). Other examples of non-fiction works:

Academic paper
Academic publishing
Almanac
Autobiography
Blueprint
Book report
Creative non-fiction
Design document
Diagram
Diary
Dictionary
Documentary film
Factual television (such as television documentaries)
Encyclopaedia
Guides and manuals
Handbook
History
Journal
Letter (collection)
Literary criticism
Miscellany
Natural history
Philosophy
Popular science
Self-help
Science book
Scientific paper
Statute
Textbook
Thesaurus
Travelogue

See also
 Documentary practice
 List of writing genres

References

External links

 What is Creative Nonfiction? 
Nonfiction – overview at the Britannica.com

 
Genres